Kouppas, also spelled in English as Couppas or Coupas (Μηχανοποιείον Αχιλλέας Κούππας Α.Ε., Achilleas Kouppas Machine Manufacturing A.E.), has historically been the most famous Greek industrial machinery and equipment manufacturer, founded in Piraeus in 1882. 

Kouppas is mostly known for equipping factories throughout Greece as well as ventures in the Middle East, undertaking design and construction of specialized heavy machinery. Areas of specialization included oil refinery equipment (utilized in ventures in Iran, Iraq, Egypt, Tunisia and Congo-Brazzaville) and boilers (its best known commercial product).  In 1972 it introduced a 14-tonne road roller model, powered by a Skoda Diesel engine.

Kouppas was one of the companies most seriously affected by the 1980s crisis in Greek industry. After serious financial trouble, it ceased operations in 1987 (105 years after its foundation), becoming one more historic Greek company to go out of business. In 1995 its facilities were acquired by BIEX Metal Constructions A.E. and Procter & Gamble Hellas A.E.

References 
 L.S. Skartsis and G.A. Avramidis, "Made in Greece", Typorama, Patras, Greece (2003)  (republished by the University of Patras Science Park, 2007)
L.S. Skartsis, "Greek Vehicle & Machine Manufacturers 1800 to present: A Pictorial History", Marathon (2012)  (eBook)
 E. Roupa and E. Hekimoglou, "I istoria tou aftokinitou stin Ellada (History of automobile in Greece)", Kerkyra - Economia publishing, Athens (2009) 
 Βιομηχανική Επιθεώρησις (Industrial Review) magazine, November 1972 issue

External links 
Historic olive processing plant in Lesvos, equipped by Kouppas

Construction equipment manufacturers of Greece
Engineering companies of Greece
Greek companies established in the 19th century
1987 disestablishments in Greece
Defunct manufacturing companies of Greece